Joe Creek is an unincorporated community in Hughes County, in the U.S. state of South Dakota.

History
A post office called Joe Creek was established in 1919, and remained in operation until 1954. The community took its name from Joe Creek. Joe Creek had a population of 5 in 1940.

References

Unincorporated communities in Hughes County, South Dakota
Unincorporated communities in South Dakota